Propaganda in Fascist Italy was used by the National Fascist Party in the years leading up to and during Benito Mussolini's leadership of Italy (1922–1943) and was a crucial instrument for acquiring and maintaining power and the implementation of Fascist policies.

History

Early Fascist Party (1919–1922)

From the formation of the Italian Fasces of Combat in 1919, the Fascists made heavy use of propaganda, including pageantry and rhetoric, to inspire the nation into the unity that would obey. The party's main propaganda tool was Il Popolo d'Italia ("The People of Italy"), a newspaper founded by Benito Mussolini in 1914, and advocated militarism and Italian irredentism.

During those years, Fascist propaganda was mostly targeted at opposing the Italian Socialist Party (PSI), the largest political movement in the country and the Fascists' main antagonist to power. The PSI was accused of being a sock puppet of the Communist Party of the Soviet Union and was often labelled as a "Russian army". Those sentiments were often shared by the Italian liberal establishment, which condemned Fascist violence but was more afraid of a Bolshevik revolution.

In addition to attacking the socialists through Il Popolo d'Italia, Mussolini often also attacked the liberal establishment of the Kingdom of Italy, which was responsible for the so-called "mutilated victory", a term used to describe Italian nationalists' dissatisfaction on the territorial rewards at the end of World War I.

In power (1922–1943)
Once Mussolini came in power, all propaganda efforts were grouped together under the press office;, and propaganda efforts were slowly organised until a Ministry of Popular Culture was created in 1937. A special propaganda ministry was created in 1935 and claimed that its purpose was to tell the truth about Fascism, refute the lies of its enemies and clear up ambiguities that were only to be expected in so large and dynamic a movement.

Themes

Personality cult

Il Duce was the centre of Fascism and portrayed as such. The Cult of personality of Il Duce was in many respects the unifying force of the fascist regime bt acting as a common denominator of various political groups and social classes in the Fascist Party and Italian society. The leadership cult helped reconcile Italians with the regime despite annoyance with local officials. A basic slogan proclaimed that Mussolini was always right.

Endless publicity revolved about Mussolini with newspapers being instructed on exactly what to report about him.

He was generally portrayed in a macho manner, but he could also appear as a Renaissance man or as a military, family or even common man. That reflected his presentation as a universal man, capable of all subjects. A light was left on in his office long after he was asleep as part of propaganda to present him as an insomniac because of his nature of being driven to work nature. Mussolini, as a practitioner of various sports such as fencing, auto racing, skiing, horse riding, lion taming and swimming, was promoted to create an image of a valiant and fearless hero. Mussolini's prestige as a hero aviator in the manner of Charles Lindbergh was especially important, as for Fascism, the aeroplane embodied qualities such as dynamism, energy and courage. Mussolini himself oversaw the photographs that could appear and rejected some, such as because he was not sufficiently prominent in a group.

Mussolini's youthfulness (when he took office, he became the youngest prime minister in Italian history), and his virile and energetic appearance were promoted. In Fascist symbolism, youth constituted a metaphor for action and vitality, which emphasizsed the nature of Fascism as a revolutionary ideology in contrast to the stasis of liberal democracy. The official Fascist hymn, Giovinezza, linked the concepts of youth, the rebirth of the nation and the reign of Mussolini into symbolic unity. The publicising of Mussolini's birthdays and illnesses were banned for journalists to give an impression of him not aging. The erotic aspect of the cult was also prominent since although Mussolini was portrayed as a respectable family man, state propaganda did meanwhile little to counter the idea that he had sexual magnetism to women and was promiscuous.

Legends of Mussolini defying death during the First World War and surviving assassination attempts were circulated to give the dictator a mythical and immortal aura. It was stated that Mussolini's body had been pierced by shrapnel just as Saint Sebastian had been pierced by arrows, the difference being that Mussolini had survived his ordeal. He was also compared to Saint Francis of Assisi, who had, like Mussolini, "suffered and sacrificed himself for others".

Mussolini's humble origin was described with explicit parallels with the life of Christ. when writing about Mussolini's blacksmith father and mother, Fascist propaganda presented them symbolically as the Holy Family ("They are but Mary and Joseph in relation to Christ"). His hometown of Predappio was developed as a place of mass tourism and symbolic pilgrimage. The Vatican implied that heavenly powers were aware that Mussolini had saved Italy from Bolshevism and thus protected him. Pope Pius XI referred to him as "the man of Providence" during the aftermath of the Lateran Treaty. The press described his speeches as sacramental meetings of Il Duce and the people. Mussolini's melodramatic style of oratory was both pantomimic and liturgical, with exaggerated poses and hand movements and prominent variations in the pitch and tone of his voice. Mussolini intended his speeches to be faith-inspiring theatrical performances and stated that "the crowd does not have to know; it must believe".

In addition to being depicted as being chosen by God, the regime presented Mussolini himself having omnipotent or godlike characteristics, such as being able to work superhuman amounts (14–16 hours) daily and never appearing tired. Fascist newspapers implied even that Mussolini had performed miracles, such as stopping the lava flow of Mount Etna and invoking rain in the drought-suffering Libya during his visit to the region in March 1937. A story of a deaf-mute boy being cured after listening in a crowd to a speech of Mussolini was told in an elementary school manual.

His overtly-belligerent image did not prevent newspapers from declaring he had done more for peace than anyone else on the principle that Mussolini always did better than everyone else.

His image proclaimed that he had improved the Italian people morally, materially and spiritually.

He was the Duce and had been proclaimed in song even before the seizure of power.

The war in Ethiopia was presented as a revival of the Roman Empire, with Mussolini as Augustus.

To improve Fascism's image in North Africa and the Levant and to gain Arab support, Mussolini had himself declared the "Protector of Islam" during an official visit to Italian Libya in 1937.

Action
Fascism was among the most visible of movements that exulted action over talk and violence over reason, which partly stemmed from World War I. That was used to justify taking up notions and dropping them again.

Economic issues were presented in a heroic and militaristic manner, with programs being termed the Battle of Wheat and the Battle of the Lira.

Military matters were also straightforwardly praised, with the aim of primacy on land, sea and air.  Because war was to man what maternity was to woman, disarmament was impossible.

War and killing were praised as the essence of manhood. A Fascist encyclopedia proclaimed, "Nothing is ever won in history without bloodshed". That drew upon older themes, which had been exulted during World War I, with injunctions that suffering was necessary for greatness. World War I was often cited in Fascist propaganda, with many prominent Fascists displaying many medals from the conflict.  To such figures as Gabriele d'Annunzio, the return of peace meant only the return of the humdrum, but the ideal was still war, themes that Fascism drew into its propaganda.  Mussolini, shortly before the seizure of power, proclaimed violence as better than compromise and bargaining. Afterwards, there was a prolonged period during which the absence of military action did not prevent the government from many belligerent statements. Interviews appearing in foreign press, in which Mussolini spoke of wanting peace, had that portion censored out before they appeared in Italian newspapers. Italian victories in the Spanish Civil War, in which the Royal Italian Army sent the Corpo Truppe Volontarie to intervene on behalf of the Nationalists, were heralded in the Fascist state media. The annexation of Albania was presented as a splendid act of aggression.  In the run-up to World War II, Mussolini's claim that he could field 8 million was quickly exaggerated to 9 million and then to 12 million. The continually-bellicose pose created an embarrassment with the outbreak of World War II since failure to join the war would undermine the propaganda effect.

The Italians were called to be like Roman legionaries, and their opponents were depicted as weak and enthralled by money. Britain was denounced in particular, but both France and later the United States, when its sympathies were clearly turning toward the Allies, also came in for abuse.

Heroism was exaggerated. The Fascists' violence prior to their seizure of power was legitimised. The March on Rome was presented mythically as a bloody and heroic seizure of power.

Futurism was a useful part of the cultural scene because of its militaristic elements.

A fascist doctrine was first set forth in The Manifesto of the Fasci of Combat. Years later, a different set of ideas were enumerated in The Doctrine of Fascism, which was purportedly written entirely by Benito Mussolini although he wrote only the second part, and the first part was actually also written by Giovanni Gentile.

Fascism's internal contradictions, such as its changing official doctrines, were justified by Mussolini as a product of its nature: a doctrine of action and a revolt against the conformity and alienation of bourgeois society:

Unity

National and social unity was symbolized by the fasces themselves, the bound sticks being stronger together than individually.  That drew on military themes from World War I during which Italians were called to pull together into a unity.  Mussolini openly proclaimed that Fascists were willing to kill or die when it was a question of the fatherland while the March on Rome was being prepared. Similarly, he declared that the State did not weaken the individual any more than a soldier was weakened by the rest of the regiment.

That was part of an explicit rejection of liberal individualism; the punitive aspect of the fasces, containing an axe, not being omitted. Furthermore, Fascism was to be a totalitarian, or total experience, since it was impossible to a Fascist only in politics, and it therefore overtly rejected liberalism's private and public spheres.  Fascism was not a party but a way of life. The corporatist state was offered as a unifying form of politics, as opposed to liberal democracy. Fascism and the state were identified, and everything was to be encompassed in the state.

Work was presented as a social duty because Italy was greater than any individual purpose. Beehives were presented as a model of industry and harmony.

Furthermore, the unity would allow the entire nation to throw itself into support of military necessity. The sanctions imposed by the League of Nations while Italy attacked Ethiopia were used to unite the country against the "aggression".

Empire
Reviving the glories of the Roman Empire in modern Italy was a common theme. That called for the control of Mare Nostrum (" Our Sea", as the Mediterranean Sea was called in Rome). France, Britain and other powers were denounced as having kept Italy immured. Concerted efforts were made to drum up enthusiasm for colonialism in the 1930s.

Besides its symbolic aspects, the fasces had been carried by the lictors of ancient Rome as a representation of authority. April 21, the anniversary of the founding of Rome, was proclaimed a fascist holiday that was intended to replace the socialist Labour Day as a celebration of the Roman virtues of "work" and "discipline". Rome's role in establishing Christianity as a universal religion was also exalted.

Architecture was used to supplement the Roman revival by juxtaposing modern monuments with ancient buildings, such as the creation of the Via dell'Impero. In the city of Rome, archaeological and propagandist projects involving the clearing, isolation (often by deliberately destroying surrounding medieval buildings) and restoration of key monuments such as the Ara Pacis and the Mausoleum of Augustus received strong support from the fascist regime. A major propaganda event was the opening of the "Augustan Exhibition of Romanitas" on 23 September 1937 to celebrate the 2000th anniversary of the birth of Augustus. There, the symbolic connection between Caesarean leadership of Augustus and Mussolini's dictatorship was stressed. At the exhibition entrance was inscribed a quote from Mussolini: "Italians, you must ensure that the glories of the past are surpassed by the triumphs of the future". Rome thus constituted a point of reference in Fascism's dream of building an aggressive and forward-looking Italy of the future. After the successful military campaign against Ethiopia and the subsequent proclamation of the Italian Empire, regime propaganda depicted Fascism now even overshadowing its Roman past.

Spazio vitale

Spazio vitale, living space, or vital space, was presented as needing conquest. It would strengthen the country by drawing off its surplus population and send landless peasants and the unemployed to work the earth, buy Italian goods and act as a garrison. Millions of Italians could live in Ethiopia, and exaggerated claims were made of its resources.

That would amend the situation after World War I in which Fascists alleged that the Allies had cheated Italy of expansion into the former Austro-Hungarian and Ottoman Empires.

Fertility
Even while arguing that the population had to be drained off, propaganda urged greater fertility and derided men who failed to produce children and women whose Parisian fashions did not fit them for bearing children. Slogans urged maternity as the female form of patriotism.  Mussolini instructed the heads of fascist women's organisations to go home and tell the women that they needed many births. To help the "battle of births", assistance had to be given to mothers and newborns, and the founding of an organisation to do so was trumpeted. Contraception was decried as producing medical problems.

Mussolini also called for a more rural Italy to increase births.

The "battles" to reclaim land and increase grain production, Mussolini trumpeted, had produced enough that Italy could hold 10 million more people.

Civilisation
Fascist rhetoric portrayed the attack on Ethiopia as advancing the cause of civilisation. Other European nations were called on to stand with Italy against alleged "savage cannibals" and "slave-holders".

That was backed up with one of their most impressive ceremonies, the Gold for the Fatherland initiative, which involved the donation of wedding rings and other forms of gold by Italian citizens in exchange for steel wristbands bearing the words "Gold for the Fatherland". Many Italians participated, and even Rachele Mussolini was known to have donated her wedding ring. The donated gold was then collected and used to fund the war effort.

Anti-Ethiopian
During the war, propaganda was spread about exaggerated Ethiopian atrocities, both the abuse of prisoners and the misuse of the Red Cross symbol on military installations.

Economics
A series of calculated lies was propagated to win support for the Ethiopian venture by claiming that Italy was self-sufficient in food, and enough oil had been stockpiled.

Bolshevism

Socialism was resisted, particularly in its internationalist forms. Socialist forces were denounced as a "Russian army".  An editorialist, afraid that Fascist violence would repulse women, warned them that the killings were necessary to save Italy from the "Bolshevist beast."

In his first speech as a deputy, Mussolini proclaimed that no dealings were possible between Communism and Fascism even while he proclaimed his willingness to work with other groups.

The Spanish Civil War was presented as a crusade against Communism.

Foreign culture
The influx of foreign culture was attacked. "Americanism" was the object of an organised propaganda campaign that attacked as a "grease stain which is spreading through the whole of European life". French and Russian novels and H. G. Wells's Outline of History were also attacked as contaminating youth. British literature was used to show them as decadent as the French, their low birth rate was decried and it was proclaimed that Italy had saved Britain and France during World War I.

Italianization of street names and monuments in linguistically-Slavic and -German regions of Italy was mandated by legislation, and teachers instructing in languages other than Italian were persecuted (See Katakombenschule). In 1926, new legislation was introduced decreeing the Italianization of Slavic surnames. Sports clubs were likewise forced to Italianize their names: A.C. Milan became Milano, and Internazionale was renamed Ambrosiana, after the patron saint of Milan.

Democracy
Democracy and liberalism were pronounced moribund, with praise cited that Fascism received everywhere and claims that the workers of North America wished they had a Mussolini. He demonstrated the inherent superiority of autocratic regimes to democracies by fixing problems to which liberalism had no answer. In 1934, Mussolini declared both democracy and liberalism dead. Bourgeois culture and morality were seen as integral parts of liberalism and were thus attacked. The bourgeoisie supposedly valued utilitarianism, materialism, well-being and maintaining the status quo instead of the fascist virtues of dynamism, courage, discipline and self-sacrifice.  An anti-bourgeois exhibition was opened on 29 November 1937. It denounced "typical aspects of bourgeois mentality" and ridiculed gestures and customs such as handshakes, suits, top hats and afternoon tea, all to which fascism was to provide its own replacements, such as the Roman salute. Even the Gregorian calendar was deemed as being bourgeois; in the Era Fascista, the year began on October 29, the day after the anniversary of the March on Rome, and the years were to be counted from 1922 by using Roman numerals.

The Nazi rise to power was used as Germany's imitating Italy, which would soon be followed by other nations.

The attack on Ethiopia was framed as Italy's vigour and idealism easily crushing the decadent, bloodless and cowardly democracies, especially as they supported barbarians over the "mother of civilizations".

Plutocracies
The United States was particularly resented for its wealth and position.

Joining World War II was presented as a war on decadent plutocracies. The powers were also claimed to have prevented Italian imperialism. Mussolini began to decry the oppression that Italy suffered as early as the peace negotiations of World War I and the first days of Fascism as a movement.

Media

Newspapers
Authorities were allowed to confiscate newspapers on the grounds of publishing false information likely to incite class hatred or to bring the government into contempt. Meanwhile, pro-Fascist journals were subsidized, and by 1926, government permission was needed to publish.

Slogans

Slogans were widely used and especially inscribed on walls.

Posters
Many of Italy's leading graphic artists produced Fascist posters.

During World War II, to counter British pamphlets that proclaimed bombs the curse of Garibaldi, posters proclaimed that a British defeat meant worse than bombs, barbarism, would befall them. Americans were depicted as ready to plunder Italy's treasures.

Exhibition
The Exhibition of the Fascist Revolution was devised as propaganda to recount Italian history to the March on Rome to engage the visitors with Fascist Italy emotionally.

March
Two major marches were devised as propaganda: the March on Rome, which brought Mussolini to power, and the March of the Iron Will, the capturing of the Ethiopian capital. The notion of a "march on Rome" was a concept to inspire heroism and sacrifice, and the Fascists made full use of the notion.

Song
Songs were widely used for propaganda purposes. Even prior to coming to power, Mussolini had been praised in song. Its anthem was Giovinezza ("Youth").

Radio
With the spread of ownership of radio units during the Fascist regime, radio became the major tool for propagandising the population. It was used to broadcast Mussolini's open-air speeches and as an instrument for propagandizing youth. The American author Ezra Pound broadcast on short-wave radio to propagandize the United States.

Film
In 1924, the Istituto Luce was set up by the fascist government to oversee cinema operations in Italy. The organisation's main role was the creation of newsreels shown before films. From 1934 to 1935, more efforts were made by the governments to control the Italian film industry. In 1934, Luigi Freddi headed the Direzione Generale per la Cinema, whose purpose was to censor films made that could be harmful for the Fascist government. That caused many American films to be banned and many Italian scripts to be modified. In 1935, the Ente Nazionale Industrie Cinematografiche (ENIC) was set up to make films after it had bought up a movie theatre chain, and it expanded in 1938 to regulate the number of foreign films coming into Italy.
The Fascist regime was never successful at making propagandist films show a political message. Film was not widely used for propaganda, as the Italian public was not interested in "serious" films that the government produced but wanted realistic films. However, censorship was heavily used to avoid unwanted material, and a governmental body was set up to produce documentaries on Fascist achievements.

Schools

Curriculums for schools were immediately overhauled for Fascist purposes in a manner that the Nazis later admitted to imitating, and elementary schools soon spent twenty percent of their time teaching children to be good Fascists. Teachers were removed if they did not conform, and textbooks were required to emphasize the "Fascist soul".

Youth groups
Young Fascists and University Fascist Groups existed to channel talent to the Fascist Party and for several years were the party's only source of new members.  Students soon learned they had to join the university groups to advance.  Mussolini proclaimed their purpose to be inspiring the youth for power and conquests as Fascists.

Up to the age of fourteen, the groups were mainly sports for physical fitness, but at fourteen, militaristic drills were added. They were given songs and commandments to mold their views. Everything from cultural institutes to camps was deployed to consolidate activities on Fascism.

Dopolavoro

See also

 Propaganda in Nazi Germany
 Japanese propaganda during World War II
 American propaganda during World War II
 British propaganda during World War II
 Propaganda in the Soviet Union

References

Fascist propaganda
Italian Fascism
Italian Social Republic
Italy
Italy
Fascist Italy
Anti-Americanism